"Lost" is a single by Grammy Award winning Dominican-American progressive house DJ Roger Sanchez, featuring Lisa Pure and Katherine Ellis. The song was featured in Sanchez's album Come with Me which was released in 2006.  The song's melody is described as reminiscent of the 1980s, but with a tincture of a new romantic shading to the synth.
The Song is a remix of a previous 2000 release by a group called Box Office featuring Stacey King on vocals, called "Just Leave me". Sanchez did 2 remixes of that song back in 2000

Chart performance
The song reached #1 in Billboard Dance chart, Hot Dance Club Play and #18 in the Hot Dance Airplay chart. It was also did well in the European charts as well. The song appeared in four European charts, Belgian Flemish Ultratop 50 Charts, Dutch Top 40, the Finnish Singles Chart and Spanish Record Charts.

Music video 
The video opens with a scene in a playground and children playing in it. The next scene breaks to a lonesome girl in a swing. The solitude of the girl is synchronized with the song's lyrics. Then the girl is seen on the top of a building near the playground. Apparently she is going to jump, only to be disturbed by the approach of a boy wearing goggles. The two share a passionate stare at each other and the video turns to an animation. The two take off the ground and fly about in the sky. Suddenly they crash into buildings, springing up from the ground and they start to free fall. The two go separate ways and the Girl is saved by an angel. The closing scene shows that back in real world the girl is on top of the building  and catching a feather falling down.

Track listings
CD-Maxi

Charts

Weekly charts

Year-end charts

See also

 House music

References

External links
 discogs.com

2006 singles
2006 songs
Roger Sanchez songs
Electronic songs
House music songs